Dominic Ng is an American banker who is Chairman, President and CEO of East West Bank in California.

Ng joined East West Bank when it was a small savings and loan association with $600 million in assets in 1991.  As of September 30, 2022 East West Bank had become a full-service commercial bank with total assets of $62.6 billion.

Early life and education
Ng was born in Hong Kong in 1959.

Ng holds a bachelor's degree from the University of Houston.

Career
Ng spent ten years as a Certified Public Accountant with Deloitte & Touche in Houston and Los Angeles.

In 1991, Ng joined East West Bank. Ng is the chairman, President and CEO of East West Bancorp, Inc. and East West Bank, headquartered in Pasadena, California.

Ng currently serves on the board of Mattel, Inc. (NYSE: MAT) . In addition, he is on the board of trustees at the University of Southern California and the Academy Museum of Motion Pictures.

From 2005 to 2011, he served on the board of directors of the Federal Reserve Bank of San Francisco, Los Angeles Branch. Dominic Ng's previous board service also includes the Asia Society, Los Angeles Mayor's Trade Advisory Council, United Way of Greater Los Angeles, PacifiCare Health Systems (formerly NYSE: PHS), Town Hall Los Angeles, The Anderson School at UCLA, and California State Treasurer's Financial Institutions Advisory Committee (chair), among other organizations.

In 2019, Ng became a board member of the Academy Museum of Motion Pictures.

Business and community leadership in the U.S.
In 2000, Ng became a member of Committee of 100. From 2011 to 2014, Ng served as Chairman of the Committee of 100.

Ng was named by the Los Angeles Business Journal as Business Person of the Year, by Forbes as one of the 25 most notable Chinese Americans, and by the Los Angeles Times as one of the 100 most influential people in Los Angeles. In 2017, American Banker recognized Ng as Banker of the Year. In 2016, Ng received The United Way Alexis de Tocqueville Award presented by United Way Worldwide that recognizes his exceptional and sustained engagement and philanthropic leadership. He was the first Asian American campaign chair for United Way of Greater Los Angeles in 2000. Centered on promoting the importance of philanthropy and the benefits of supporting high-impact charities such as the United Way, Ng's campaign raised record funds.

Promoting Chinese culture in the U.S.
Ng has been an advocate and sponsor of bringing Chinese culture and art to major U.S. institutions, including Los Angeles County Museum of Art, the Museum of Contemporary Art, Los Angeles, Huntington Library, Bowers Museum, and the USC Pacific Asia Museum.

Ng served as an executive director of the China Overseas Exchange Association between 2013 and 2017. In 2019, Ng became an executive director of the China Overseas Friendship Association.

Frequent speaker on global forums
Ng is a frequent speaker on U.S.-China relations, economics, finance, banking, arts and culture, philanthropy and other topics.  He has addressed business, political, academic and civic audiences in the U.S. and Greater China, including Boao Forum for Asia, China-United States Exchange Foundation, Asia Society, Committee of 100, Chinese CEO Organization, Federal Reserve Bank, Los Angeles County Economic Development Corporation, Milken Institute, the United States Conference of Mayors and United Way, Los Angeles County Museum of Art, and among others.

Honors and awards
 The United Way Alexis de Tocqueville Award from United Way Worldwide
 Humanitarian Award from the Anti-Defamation League’s Pacific Southwest Region;
 Top 20 of 2013 U.S.-China Economic and Trade Leaders from the Sino-U.S. Times;
 Business Person of the Year Award from Los Angeles Business Journal;
 Chinese CEO of the Year Award from Chinese CEO Organization;.
 Treasures of Los Angeles Award from Central City Association;
 Eddy Award from Los Angeles Economic Development Corporation;
 Asian and Pacific Islander American Heritage Dream of Los Angeles Award;
 Innovation and Visionary Award from Alfred Mann Foundation;
 Entrepreneur of the Year in Financial Services Award from Ernst & Young;
 Received an honorary doctor of law degree from Occidental College
 Received an honorary fellowship from Lingnan University in Hong Kong.

References

External links 

 Committee of 100 Member Roster

1959 births
Living people
American bankers
American chief executives
Hong Kong emigrants to the United States
American people of Chinese descent
People from Pasadena, California
University of Houston alumni
Deloitte people
Members of Committee of 100
American accountants